Michael Roger Binyon  OBE is an English journalist and eminent foreign correspondent, known for serving as The Times's Moscow Correspondent as well as reporting from Bonn, Washington and all over the Middle East. He is currently a leader writer for The Times and occasional arts and books critic.

Education
After Leighton Park School, Binyon went up to read his degree at Magdalene College, Cambridge in 1963, where he was a direct contemporary of BBC foreign correspondent John Simpson, both reading English. Binyon later switched to Arabic, graduating in 1967.

Career
After teaching English in Minsk for a year, he began his career at the BBC Arabic Service and the Times Educational Supplement. He reported from Moscow in the 70s, and went on to cover the fall of the Berlin Wall and numerous Middle East conflicts. Other positions he has held at The Times include: diplomatic editor, Washington bureau chief and Brussels correspondent, where his opposite number at The Telegraph was one Boris Johnson.

Awards & honours
Binyon was awarded the OBE in 2000 for services to international journalism.
His reporting from Moscow garnered two British Press Awards in 1979 and 1980.
From 2008 to 2009, he was master of the British Leathersellers' Company.

References

Living people
British reporters and correspondents
The Times people
British war correspondents
Officers of the Order of the British Empire
Writers on the Middle East
Alumni of the University of Cambridge
British expatriates in the United States
British expatriates in Belgium
Year of birth missing (living people)